Scott Timmins (born September 11, 1989) is a Canadian professional ice hockey player who is currently playing for Fehérvár AV19 of the Austrian Hockey League (EBEL). He was selected by the Florida Panthers in the 6th round (165th overall) of the 2009 NHL Entry Draft.

Playing career
Scott grew up in Hamilton, Ontario where he spent most of his minor hockey career playing for the Hamilton Reps of the Alliance Pavilion League. He led his Reps team to an Alliance Championship in Minor Midget in 2004-05 before being a 5th round choice (98th overall) of the Kitchener Rangers in the 2005 OHL Priority Selection.

Timmins was reassigned the following season to the Burlington Cougars Jr.A. club of the Ontario Junior Hockey League (OHA) for the 2005-06 season. The following year, he signed with the Rangers for the 2006-07 season.

On April 24, 2010, Timmins, with the Ontario Hockey League's Windsor Spitfires, scored a natural hat trick against the Kitchener Rangers during game 6 of the OHL Western Conference final. The final score was 6–4, in favour of Windsor.

Timmins made his NHL debut with the Florida Panthers during the 2010–11 season on February 1, 2011 and scored his first NHL goal a day later against Alex Auld of the Montreal Canadiens.

On September 28, 2013, Timmins was traded by the Panthers to the New Jersey Devils in exchange for Krystofer Barch. During his tenure with the Devils, he was primarily assigned to AHL affiliate, the Albany Devils.

Unsigned over the summer leading into the 2015–16 season, Timmin accepted a try-out offer to attend the San Jose Barracuda AHL training camp on September 28, 2015. He made the inaugural opening night roster with the Barracuda.

As a free agent the following off-season, Timmins left North America to sign a one-year contract abroad, agreeing with German club, Straubing Tigers of the Deutsche Eishockey Liga on July 27, 2016. In the 2016–17 season, Timmins contributed offensively with the Tigers, producing 12 goals and 27 points in 46 games.

On August 14, 2017, Timmins left Germany as a free agent, signing to an initial one-year contract in the neighbouring EBEL, with Austrian club, Dornbirn Bulldogs.

After two seasons with Dornbirn, Timmins left the Bulldogs as a free agent and continued in the EBEL, signing with Hungarian competitors, Fehérvár AV19, on April 10, 2019.

Timmins in now a member of the Melbourne Mustangs in the AIHL as of May 2022.

Career statistics

References

External links

1989 births
Albany Devils players
Canadian ice hockey centres
Dornbirn Bulldogs players
Florida Panthers draft picks
Florida Panthers players
Ice hockey people from Ontario
Kitchener Rangers players
Living people
Rochester Americans players
San Antonio Rampage players
San Jose Barracuda players
Sportspeople from Hamilton, Ontario
Straubing Tigers players
Windsor Spitfires players
Canadian expatriate ice hockey players in Austria
Canadian expatriate ice hockey players in Germany